The Esopus was a tribe of Lenape (Delaware) Native Americans who were native to the Catskill Mountains of what is now Upstate New York. Their lands included modern-day Ulster and Sullivan counties.

The Lenape originally resided in the Delaware River Valley before their territory extended into parts of modern-day New York (including the Catskill Mountains and Lower Hudson River Valley), Pennsylvania, New Jersey, and Eastern Delaware. The exact population of the Lenape is unknown but estimated to have been around 10,000 people in 1600. The Esopus people spoke an Algonquin dialect known as Munsee.

The tribe generally lived in small communities consisting of 10 to 100 people. They traveled seasonally and settled mostly in clearings by sources of water, developing diverse agricultural practices. The Esopus people's main crop was corn, but also planted or foraged beans, squash, hickory, nuts, and berries in addition to hunting elk, deer, rabbits, turkey, raccoons, waterfowl, bears, and fish. They generally ate two meals a day according to what was seasonally available.

Socially, the Esopus people historically had strict heterosexual marriages with rules to prevent inbreeding. The average lifespan was generally 35 to 40 years old. Sachems or chiefs were temporary power holders meant to make decisions based on the well-being of the tribe, and although there were definite gendered roles within the tribal community, there was no sense of patriarchal structure.

History

Esopus Wars

The first believed interaction between colonists and the Esopus people was recorded in 1609. Historian Herbert C. Kraft believes some Esopus joined with some Wappinger people after Kieft's War in 1643.

In 1652, the Esopus tribe sold 72 acres of land to European colonists through the Thomas Chambers land deed in Kingston, New York. It is unknown whether the two Esopus sachems at the time, Kawachhikan and Sowappekat, understood the transaction, as in addition to a language barrier, their culture had foundational differences in understanding money, ownership, and legal transactions. This deed began centuries of dispossession which continued through the Fisher/Rutgers Land Deed of 1899 and the Peter Stuyvesant Stockade.

The tribe fought a series of conflicts against settlers from the New Netherland colony from September 1659 to September 1663, known as the Esopus Wars, in and around Kingston. At the conclusion of the conflict, the tribe sold large tracts of land to French Huguenot refugees in New Paltz and other communities.

The Esopus Wars devastated many Lenape communities in what is now Ulster County. Populations dwindled through warfare with Dutch and French settlers, in addition to widespread disease, with smallpox being the most deadly. Intertribal warfare exacerbated casualties.

Esopus people today 
After the Esopus wars, many Stockbridge-Munsee moved to Western New York near Oneida Lake. They were eventually pushed off these lands by the Indian Removal Treaties in the 19th century, and eventually forced to settle on “inhospitable land” in Wisconsin by the 1830s.

Today, descendants of the Esopus now live on the Stockbridge-Munsee Community reservation in Shawano County, Wisconsin and among the Munsee-Delaware Nation of Ontario, Canada.

See also
Esopus Wars

References

External links 
 Stockbridge-Munsee Community Band of Mohican Indians, official website
 Eelūnaapèewii Lahkèewiit, Delaware Nation, Ontario, official website

Lenape
Indigenous peoples of the Northeastern Woodlands
Algonquian peoples
Native American history of New York (state)
Native American tribes in New York (state)
Native American tribes in Wisconsin
People of New Netherland
Algonquian ethnonyms